Dwayne Lamont Morton (born August 10, 1971) is a retired American professional basketball player. Born and raised in Louisville, Kentucky, he played 41 games for the National Basketball Association's Golden State Warriors during the 1994–95 NBA season.

In 2009-10 he played professionally in Bulgaria for Chernomorets Burgas, his 4th team while in the country. Prior to his campaign in Bulgaria he played in Israel, England, France and the Dominican Republic.

References

External links
NBA stats @ NBA.com

1971 births
Living people
American expatriate basketball people in Bulgaria
American expatriate basketball people in the Dominican Republic
American expatriate basketball people in France
American expatriate basketball people in Israel
American expatriate basketball people in the United Kingdom
American men's basketball players
Basketball players from Louisville, Kentucky
BC Balkan Botevgrad players
BC Levski Sofia players
Golden State Warriors draft picks
Golden State Warriors players
Louisville Cardinals men's basketball players
McDonald's High School All-Americans
Parade High School All-Americans (boys' basketball)
Small forwards